Jinx is the debut studio album by American pop band Crumb, released June 14, 2019.

Background 
The album's titular "Jinx", about a curse which befalls the band, was inspired by a near death experience involving the band, when they were in a near fatal car accident in Montreal in 2018. After the accident, several members of the band were injured and had to perform in casts. The album was produced and released independently, and was fully funded by listeners.

Music

Composition 
The album blends psych pop and indie rock. Some of the album's tracks contain heavy jazz influences, including keyboard riffs and minimal production effects. It is also influenced by lo-fi music aesthetics, including synthesizers. Rebecca Hammond of STGA, said that Ramani's vocals on the album are "a mix of grunge and indie", while the instrumentation evoked the psychedelic music of the 1960s.

Lyrics 
Lyrically, the album is mostly abstract with only loose storytelling. However, many of its tracks focus on anxiety, fear of the unknown, and the uncanny aspects of mundanity. Sophia Ordaz of Slant Magazine compared its disorienting atmosphere to Radiohead’s OK Computer album.

Track listing

All songs composed by the members of Crumb.

Personnel
 Lila Ramani – guitar, vocals
 Jesse Brotter – bass, vocals
 Bri Aronow – synthesizers, keyboard, saxophone
 Jonathan Gilad – drums

Release and reception 

On April 9, 2019, Crumb released "Nina", the lead single from Jinx, and announced the album's release in June. The music video for "Nina" was directed by Haoyan of America, and starred David Patrick Kelly.

Critical reception 
The album was met with generally positive reviews. Writing for Pitchfork, Ann-Derrick Gaillot said that it "[bends] indie rock and jazz influences to shape a clear-eyed perspective tinted amber with dirt." Wilf Skinner of Clash called it "hard to dislike [...] also a tad hard to really love."

Irene Monokandilos of Consequence of Sound praised the songwriting and instrumentation on the album, while commenting that the tracks could be somewhat indistinct, saying it "toes the line between a solid piece of work from start to finish and a 10-track blur." The album's lead single "Nina" was praised for its composition and use of psych-rock influences.

The album received a nomination for Best Indie Rock Album at the 2020 Libera Awards.

References

2019 debut albums
Dream pop albums by American artists